Petro Oparin (born 13 May 1991) is a Ukrainian football defender.

Oparin began his playing career with Shakhtar Donetsk's youth team. Than he spent some years in Shakhtar Donetsk football system. In February 2011 he signed two years deal with SC Tavriya. But on 31 October 2011 he left this club.

He is a son of another Ukrainian and Soviet footballer Andriy Oparin.

International career 
He played some matches for Ukraine national under-17 football team.

References

External links 
 
 
 

1991 births
Living people
People from Saky
Ukrainian footballers
FC Shakhtar Donetsk players
FC Shakhtar-3 Donetsk players
SC Tavriya Simferopol players
FC Stal Alchevsk players
FC Rubin Yalta players
FC Krymteplytsia Molodizhne players
FC Yevpatoriya players
FC Sevastopol (Russia) players
Ukrainian First League players
Ukrainian Second League players
Crimean Premier League players
Association football defenders